The Tall Man  may refer to:

 The Tall Man: Death and Life on Palm Island a 2008 non-fiction book by Chloe Hooper
 The Tall Man (2011 film), a 2011 Australian documentary based on Chloe Hooper's book, directed by Tony Krawitz 
 The Tall Man (2012 film), a 2012 film directed by Pascal Laugier
 The Tall Man (TV series), a 1960s Western television series
 Tall Man (Phantasm), a fictional character in the Phantasm film series

See also
 Tall Man (disambiguation)
 The Tall Men (disambiguation)